The 1970–71 season was Port Vale's 59th season of football in the Football League, and their first (seventh overall) season back in the Third Division following their promotion from the Fourth Division. Gordon Lee led his team to safety in the league, though Vale exited both cup competitions at the first stage.

Overview

Third Division
The pre-season saw the arrival of centre-half Roy Cross (Walsall); inside-forward Brian Horton (Hednesford Town); and full-back Mick Hopkinson (Mansfield Town).

The season began with two wins, but a run of one win in ten games then followed. In September, four of the five directors resigned, one of them (Len Cliff) stated that "the club is being run by outsiders". A new board was formed by November. Meanwhile, on 13 September the club suffered a loss of 7–3 at Gay Meadow to Shrewsbury Town, despite a Bobby Gough hat-trick – the match also saw a sending off, an attempted pitch invasion, and a £35 fine for Gordon Lee for remarks he made to referee Ricky Nicholson. Tommy McLaren then returned from injury to lead Vale on a four match winning streak that included a 2–0 win over fallen-giants Aston Villa in front of a Burslem crowd of 11,224 fans. Four straight defeats soon came after this sequence however, as Vale's form was patchy. In December, Ron Wilson left the club as he emigrated to South Africa due to his son's ill health. A 1–0 defeat at Villa Park on 16 January was the first of a nine match streak without a victory. At the end of the month Lee signed John Brodie from Northern Premier League side Bradford Park Avenue for £250. During this spell forward Sammy Morgan began to be jeered by fans after losing his scoring touch. He also began studying to be a teacher. Lee said that "I really feel some of our lads have been singled out by the boo boys. If only they realised that encouragement can lift players, things would be so much better". In February, Mark Singer resigned as chairman, and was replaced by Graham Bourne. By then the club were hovering above the relegation zone, but a record of just ten goals conceded in their final twelve games was enough to secure safety, with Brian Horton in good form.

They finished in seventeenth spot, their 42 points leaving them three clear of relegation. John James was the top-scorer with fifteen goals. As a reward for their endeavours, the players were taken on a working holiday to Benidorm, Spain.

Finances
On the financial side, a profit of £3,424 was made, the club's first profitable season since 1962–63. A £19,322 donation from the Sportsmen's Association and the Development Fund helped to reduce the club's total debt to £134,640. Three players were released: Mick Hopkinson (Boston United); John Green (Northwich Victoria); and John King (Wigan Athletic).

Cup competitions
In the FA Cup, Vale were knocked out in the First Round by Fourth Division Notts County 1–0 in a 'physical' encounter at Meadow Lane.

In the League Cup, Vale were eliminated once again at the first stage, this time Walsall left Burslem with a 1–0 win.

League table

Results
Port Vale's score comes first

Football League Third Division

Results by matchday

Matches

FA Cup

League Cup

Player statistics

Appearances

Top scorers

Transfers

Transfers in

Transfers out

References
Specific

General

Port Vale F.C. seasons
Port Vale